Debra McGrath (born July 5, 1954) is a Canadian actress and comedian.

Education
Debra McGrath was born in Toronto in 1954. She studied theatre at Ryerson Polytechnical Institute (now Toronto Metropolitan University).

Career

McGrath first started her career with three years as a member of The Second City Toronto, Ontario, from 1983-1985, where she was a writer and actress, and eventually a director. She was best known for a take-off of Marilyn Monroe, and the song Condoms are a Girl's Best Friend. During the late 1980s, she appeared with Second City at anniversary, comedy festival and Club Soda performances.

In 1987, McGrath starred in Spoof, a comedy pilot written by Brian Cooke and Perry Rosemond. In 1989, she had a major role in Allan King's film Termini Station. She also appeared in Eugene Levy's 1992 TV film Partners 'N Love, in which she played a lawyer whose client's divorce was found to be invalid.

In 1990, with Linda Kash, McGrath co-created My Talk Show, a sitcom featuring a talk show broadcast from the host's basement. The series ran for one year, with fifty-nine episodes. Producer Bob Tischler cast Cynthia Stevenson as the host, while McGrath played a local dinner theatre owner, actress and head of the Chamber of Commerce. Initial reviews were very positive, predicting that McGrath would become the Carl Reiner of the 1990s. However, ratings were low, the host character left the show and McGrath's character became the host. Ratings did not improve (one reviewer considered that McGrath's character was "a grating, overbearing bimbo whose I-have-no-idea-who-my-guests-are routine gets boring fast") and the show folded after one season. McGrath was also a co-writer of the Canadian Women's Television Network's Go Girl!, a send-up of a cable TV talk show that debuted in 1997.

In 2002, McGrath appeared in the film Expecting, directed by Deborah Day, which won Most Popular Canadian Film at the 2002 Vancouver International Film Festival. McGrath played a dermatologist, the childless older sister of the pregnant star, and her performance was noted by several reviewers as "show[ing] the wounded heart beneath the careerist's brittle exterior"; "McGrath is the other standout as Anita, by far the richest character in the film. Neurotic and condescending to everyone around her, Anita is quick to deliver zingers, then filled with regret for what she's said. McGrath is sharp and touching, surprisingly substantial in a film that's ultimately fluff." For this role, McGrath won the award for Best Performance in a Feature (Female) at the 2004 Canadian Comedy Awards.

Alongside Paul O'Sullivan, Rebecca Northan, Lisa Merchant and Peter Oldring, she received a Gemini Award nomination for Ensemble Performance in a Comedy Program or Series at the 19th Gemini Awards in 2004 for The Joe Blow Show.

With her husband, Colin Mochrie, and Deborah Day, McGrath co-created and starred in the CBC television series Getting Along Famously (2006), about a fictional couple who star in a 1960s TV variety show. The 2005 pilot show of Getting Along Famously was nominated for two Gemini Awards, including Best Writing in a Comedy or Variety Program or Series. She also starred in the children's series Seven Little Monsters (2000-2003), and in Little Mosque on the Prairie (2007-2012) in which she played Mayor Popowitcz.  She co-starred with Spencer Rice in Single White Spenny in 2011.

In 2003, she formed a comedy troupe called Women Fully Clothed with four other Canadian comedy artists. Fellow cast members Kathy Greenwood, Robin Duke, Jayne Eastwood, Teresa Pavlinek and McGrath perform sketches about situations ordinary women face every day. One reviewer considered that "Although all five comedians have performance skills in spades, Kathryn Greenwood and Debra McGrath are standouts, ... the latter for her dancing skills. ... McGrath cuts a mean rug in her tap shoes, and her monologue in the routine about being on the phone with her mum and granny hit very close to the bone." McGrath left the troupe in the first half of 2009.

McGrath played Cornelia in the 2003 live-action films Eloise at the Plaza and Eloise at Christmastime. She has made numerous guest appearances on a variety of Canadian TV series and had a regular role in seasons one (2001) and two (2004) of Paradise Falls. She has also voiced characters in many other animated shows, including The Raccoons (1991), The Busy World of Richard Scarry (1993-1997), Stories From My Childhood (1998), George and Martha (Valerie Chuckles, 1999-2000),  Babar (2000), George Shrinks (Mrs Lopez, 2000-2001), Peep and the Big Wide World and Franklin and the Green Knight (2000).

Personal life 
McGrath was formerly married to Dana Andersen. She married fellow comedian and Second City alumnus Colin Mochrie in 1989. They live in Leaside, Toronto. They have one child, a son, Luke Mochrie.  McGrath collects 1950s Italian Murano glass.

McGrath and her husband Mochrie are both related to Canadian actor Munro Chambers.  In a 2010 interview, Chambers stated:

"I could say many things... my uncle, for one thing, is Colin Mochrie. He's been my inspiration getting into the industry. He's my uncle-in-law; his wife is my dad's cousin. My dad and his cousin, they were kind of like brother and sister growing up, so he’s my uncle by law. We have a good relationship."

Filmography

References

External links
 

1954 births
Living people
Actresses from Toronto
Canadian film actresses
Canadian people of Irish descent
Canadian television actresses
Canadian voice actresses
20th-century Canadian actresses
21st-century Canadian actresses
Canadian Comedy Award winners